The Westmeath Independent is a local newspaper serving County Westmeath, Ireland. It is based in the town of Athlone. Publication is weekly on Wednesdays. It is owned by Celtic Media Group.

Circulation as of 2012 was 7726.

References

External links

Athlone
Mass media in County Westmeath
Newspapers published in the Republic of Ireland
Publications with year of establishment missing
Weekly newspapers published in Ireland